Marta Randall (born 1948 in Mexico City) is an American science fiction writer.

In addition to writing numerous science fiction novels and short fiction, Marta Randall has edited the New Dimensions science fiction anthology series, and The Nebula Awards #19.

She has taught science fiction writing at the Clarion East and Clarion West writing workshops, UC Berkeley extension, Portland State University, and at private workshops. From 1981 through 1984, she served first as Vice-President and later the first female President of the Science Fiction Writers of America.

Randall has published under the pseudonym Martha Conley as well as her real name.

Bibliography

Kennerin Saga
Journey (Pocket Books, 1978)
Dangerous Games (Mercury Press, 1980)

Other novels
A City in the North (1976, Warner Books)
Islands (1976, Pyramid) (Nebula Award nominee)
The Sword of Winter (1983, Timescape)
Those Who Favor Fire (1984, Pocket Books)
Growing Light (as Martha Conley) (1993, St. Martins Press)
Mapping Winter (2019, Riders Guild #1, Endeavor Venture)
The River South (2019, Riders Guild #2, Endeavor Venture)

Collections
Collected Stories (2007)

Short stories
"Smack Run" (1972); New Worlds 5
"A Scarab in the City of Time" (1975); New Dimensions 5
"Megan's World" (1976); The Crystal Ship
"Secret Rider" (1976); New Dimensions 6
"The State of the Art on Alyssum" (1977); New Dimensions 7
"The View from Endless Scarp" (1979); The Magazine of Fantasy & Science Fiction
"The Captain and the Kid" (1979); Universe 9
"Circus" (1980); New Dimensions 10
"Sugarfang" (1980); Shayol #4
"Emris: An Excerpt" (1981); A Fantasy Reader: The Seventh World Fantasy Convention Book 
"Singles" (1982); Shadows 5
"Meya" (excerpt) (1984); Norwescon 7 Program Book 
"On Cannon Beach" (1984); Asimov's Science Fiction
"Thank You, Mr. Halifax" (1984); Omni Magazine
"Big Dome" (1985); The Planets
"Sea Changes" (1985); Asimov's Science Fiction
"Lapidary Nights" (1987); Universe 17
"Undeniably Cute: A Cautionary Tale" (1985); Asimov's Science Fiction
"Haunted" (1987); The Twilight Zone Magazine
"A Question of Magic" (1990); Tales of the Witch World 3
"Managing Helen" (2003); The Readerville Journal
"The Dark Boy" (2007); The Magazine of Fantasy & Science Fiction
"Làzaro y Antonio" (2007); The Magazine of Fantasy & Science Fiction

Anthologies edited
New Dimensions 11 (1980) (with Robert Silverberg)
New Dimensions 12 (1981) (with Robert Silverberg)
The Nebula Awards #19 (1984)

References

External links
 
 
 
 Martha Conley at LC Authorities, with 1 record

20th-century American novelists
American science fiction writers
American women short story writers
American women novelists
Writers from Mexico City
1948 births
Living people
Women science fiction and fantasy writers
20th-century American women writers
20th-century American short story writers
21st-century American women